"Somebody's Been Sleeping" is a 1969 song recorded by American funk and soul group 100 Proof (Aged In Soul).

Background
Songwriting-production team Holland-Dozier-Holland had left Motown Records in 1967 over a dispute about royalties, and set up their own label, Hot Wax/Invictus, shortly after. They put together 100 Proof as a funk and soul act for their new label. Joe Stubbs, formerly of Motown groups The Contours and The Originals, was made co-lead singer, along with Steve Mancha (who provides lead vocals on this track).

Details
Written by General Johnson (lead singer of Chairmen Of The Board), Angelo Bond, and Greg Perry (who also acted as producer), the song depicts a cheated lover discovering evidence of his woman's infidelity, quoting liberally from the folk tale "Goldilocks and the Three Bears". Released as 100 Proof's second single, it became a Top Ten hit on the US pop chart, reaching #8 in 1970, and performed even better on the R&B chart, making it to #6. Although the group would continue to score R&B hits up until their break-up in 1973, none of their singles reached the same level of success. "Somebody's Been Sleeping" also sold over a million copies and was certified gold by the RIAA.

1969 songs